Jamison City is a census-designated place in Sugarloaf Township, Columbia County, Pennsylvania, United States. It is part of Northeastern Pennsylvania. The population was 134 at the 2010 census. It is part of the Bloomsburg-Berwick micropolitan area.

Geography
Jamison City is located at  (41.301523, -76.366443), in the northern reaches of Columbia County. It is in northern Sugarloaf Township and is bordered on the north by Davidson Township in Sullivan County.

The CDP is situated on mostly level terrain, and surrounded on the north, east, and west by mountains. The East Branch of Fishing Creek runs through Jamison City.

History

Jamison City was formed at the northern terminus of the Bloomsburg and Sullivan Railroad. In 1889 a sawmill was built in Jamison City. However, it stopped producing wood in 1912, and the final load of lumber from it was shipped to Bloomsburg in 1914. A tannery was built in Jamison City, but it was closed in 1925.

Demographics

As of the census of 2000, there were 102 people, 46 households, and 28 families residing in the CDP. The population density was 417.1 people per square mile (164.1/km). There were 96 housing units at an average density of 392.6/sq mi (154.4/km). The racial makeup of the CDP was 100.00% White.

There were 46 households, out of which 23.9% had children under the age of 18 living with them, 50.0% were married couples living together, 6.5% had a female householder with no husband present, and 39.1% were non-families. 30.4% of all households were made up of individuals, and 21.7% had someone living alone who was 65 years of age or older. The average household size was 2.22 and the average family size was 2.79.

In the CDP, the population was spread out, with 19.6% under the age of 18, 7.8% from 18 to 24, 34.3% from 25 to 44, 12.7% from 45 to 64, and 25.5% who were 65 years of age or older. The median age was 40 years. For every 100 females, there were 100.0 males. For every 100 females age 18 and over, there were 110.3 males.

The median income for a household in the CDP was $36,250, and the median income for a family was $36,250. Males had a median income of $35,000 versus $20,156 for females. The per capita income for the CDP was $17,873. There were 6.3% of families and 4.2% of the population living below the poverty line, including 12.0% of under eighteens and none of those over 64.

References

Bloomsburg–Berwick metropolitan area
Census-designated places in Columbia County, Pennsylvania
Census-designated places in Pennsylvania